The 1914 municipal election was held December 14, 1914 to elect a mayor and six aldermen to sit on Edmonton City Council and three trustees to sit on each of the public and separate school boards.

There were ten aldermen on city council, but four of the positions were already filled: Joseph Clarke, Rice Sheppard, J. A. Kinney, and Robert Douglas were all elected to two-year terms in 1913 and were still in office. Alexander Campbell had also been elected to a two-year term, but had resigned.  Accordingly, the fifth-place finisher from the north side of the North Saskatchewan River - W C Mcarthur - was elected to a one-year term to replace Campbell.

There were seven trustees on the public school board, but four of the positions were already filled: Walter Ramsey, Samuel Barnes, A E May, and J S Hill had been elected to two-year terms in 1913.  The same was true of the separate board, where D J Gilmurray, J O'Neill, Joseph Henri Picard, and E P O'Donnell were continuing.

Voter turnout

There were 10220 ballots cast out of 32246 eligible voters, for a voter turnout of 31.4%.

Results

 bold indicates elected
 italics indicate incumbent
 South Side indicates representative for Edmonton's South Side, with a minimum South Side representation instituted after the city of Strathcona, south of the North Saskatchewan River, amalgamated into Edmonton on February 1, 1912.

Mayor

William Thomas Henry - 8021
Joseph Adair - 1964

Aldermen

James Ramsey - 7286
Samuel Wallace Williamson - 5,905
Robert Neville Frith - 5836
Joseph Henri Picard - 5814
William Campbell McArthur - 5506
Hugh Alfred Calder - 4871 (South Side)
Archibald Menzies McDonald - 3,166
Joseph Driscoll - 2,546
Alexander Clubb - 2,049
James East - 1,908
Charles Gowan - 1,700
Isidore Tremblay - 1,114
John Hilton Treble - 844
Tom Fraser Mayson - 470

Public school trustees

Charles Gibbs, J J McKenzie, and William Rea were elected.  Detailed information is no longer available.

Separate (Catholic) school trustees

A H Esch, Joseph Gariépy, and M J O'Farrell were elected.  Detailed results are no longer available.

References

Election History, City of Edmonton: Elections and Census Office

1914
1914 elections in Canada
1914 in Alberta